Nadzeya Pisarava (born July 5, 1988 in Kingisepp) is a retired Belarusian biathlete. She competed at the Biathlon World Championships 2011, where she won a bronze medal in the relay with the Belarusian team.

References

1988 births
Belarusian female biathletes
Biathlon World Championships medalists
Biathletes at the 2014 Winter Olympics
Biathletes at the 2018 Winter Olympics
Olympic biathletes of Belarus
Living people